Ameka is a surname. Notable people with the surname include:

Felix Ameka, Ghanaian linguist 
Louis Ameka (born 1996), Gabonese footballer

See also
Emeka